Krasnoarmeysky is a rural locality (a khutor) and the administrative center of Krasnoarmeyskoye Rural Settlement, Novonikolayevsky District, Volgograd Oblast, Russia. The population was 958 as of 2010. There are 21 streets.

Geography 
Krasnoarmeysky is located in steppe, on the Khopyorsko-Buzulukskaya Plain, 51 km northeast of Novonikolayevsky (the district's administrative centre) by road. Novoberezovsky is the nearest rural locality.

References 

Rural localities in Novonikolayevsky District